The following lists events that happened during 2008 in Guinea.

Events

May
 May 27 - Protesting soldiers seize the deputy head of the Army of Guinea a week after Lansana Kouyate is dismissed as Prime Minister.

December
 December 23 - A military coup is announced in Guinea, hours after the death of President Lansana Conté.
 December 30 - The National Council for Democracy and Development, the ruling military junta of Guinea after a recent coup, appoints Kabiné Komara as the country's new Prime Minister.

References

 
2000s in Guinea
Guinea
Guinea
Years of the 21st century in Guinea